Talwara is a census town in Hoshiarpur district in the Indian state of Punjab. It is near to the border of the state of Himachal Pradesh.This place is known for proximity to Pong Dam and was mainly populated during the construction of the same. It is situated on the banks of Pong Left Main Canal. locally known as Shah Neher. It consists of 4 sectors and a main market, where people can get there day-to-day needs. Prominent personalities include Mrs. Ankita Jamwal of Datarpur. It is also called Mini Chandigarh for its cleanliness, a rock/rose garden and infrastructure.

Geography
It has an average elevation of 326 metres (1069 ft).

Talwara Township generally known as Talwara is named after a small nearby village name Talwara. It is approximately 75 km from district headquarter Hoshiarpur City and 28 km from the Mukerian City. It is situated about 22 km from the Hindu temple of Mata Chinta-Poorni darbar (in Himanchal Pradesh).
It is a town located at the fringes of Shivalik range of mountains. The Pong Dam (the Beas Dam) is also known as TALWARA dam is only 15 km from here.

Demographics
 India census, Talwara had a population of 22,580. Males constitute 53% of the population and females 47%. Talwara has an average literacy rate of 80%, higher than the national average of 59.5%: male literacy is 83%, and female literacy is 76%. In Talwara, 11% of the population is under 6 years of age.

References

External links 
 talwara.com : Website of Talwara
 Talwara community @ Orkut
 Talwara On Facebook
 Talwara Today
 History of Talwara
 talwara photography
 Harish vasdev
 Sahil kapoor
 Amit Parmar

Cities and towns in Hoshiarpur district